! is a punctuation mark, called an exclamation mark (33 in ASCII), exclamation point, ecphoneme, or bang.

! or exclamation point may also refer to:

Mathematics and computers 
Factorial, a mathematical function
Derangement, a related mathematical function
Negation, in logic and some programming languages
Uniqueness quantification, in mathematics and logic
! (CONFIG.SYS directive), usage for unconditional execution of directives in FreeDOS configuration files

Music 
! (The Dismemberment Plan album), 1995
! (Donnie Vie album), 2016
"!" (The Song Formerly Known As), a single on the album Unit by Regurgitator
Exclamation Mark (album), an album by Jay Chou
Exclamation Point LP, by DA!
! (Trippie Redd album), 2019, or the title track，
! (Cláudia Pascoal album), 2020

Other 
ǃ, the IPA symbol for postalveolar click in speech
An indicator of a good chess move in punctuation
A dereference operator in BCPL

See also 
!! (disambiguation)
!!! (disambiguation)
Interrobang, the nonstandard mix of a question mark and an exclamation mark
ḷ, not the exclamation mark, but a lower-case letter Ḷ used in Asturian